Yolveren is a village in the Araban District, Gaziantep Province, Turkey.

References

Villages in Araban District